Lon R. Graf (June 12, 1896 – November 7, 1986) was an American college football player and coach. He served as the head football coach at Peru State College from 1923 to 1929, compiling a record of 47–7–6.

Head coaching record

College

References

External links
 

1896 births
1986 deaths
Nebraska Cornhuskers football players
Peru State Bobcats athletic directors
Peru State Bobcats football coaches
High school football coaches in Nebraska